The 1963–64 Montenegrin Republic League was 19th season of Montenegrin Republic League. Season started in August 1963 and finished in May 1964.

Season 

Except the teams from previous year, a new member of the competition was Zeta. They replaced a last placed team from previous season (Arsenal). At the end of 18 weeks long competition, OFK Titograd won the title, with only single point more than Lovćen. With that result, Titograd participated in the qualifiers for Yugoslav Second League. Last-placed Zeta was relegated.

Table

Qualifiers for Yugoslav Second League 
Titograd played in the qualifiers for 1964-65 Second League - East. They were defeated by champion of Republic League of SR Macedonia - Bregalnica Štip, so didn't get promotion to higher level.

Higher leagues 
On season 1963–64, two Montenegrin teams played in higher leagues of SFR Yugoslavia. Both of them (Budućnost and Sutjeska) participated in 1963–64 Yugoslav Second League.

See also 
 Montenegrin Republic League
 Montenegrin Republic Cup (1947–2006)
 Montenegrin clubs in Yugoslav football competitions (1946–2006)
 Montenegrin Football Championship (1922–1940)

References 

Montenegrin Republic League